Zawiyat al Urqub is a town in the District of Jabal al Akhdar in north-eastern Libya. It is located 30 km west of Bayda

Photo gallery

References

Cyrenaica
Populated places in Jabal al Akhdar